Doug Bell (born 1961) is a veteran sportscaster who works with WJOX-AM.

He served as sports director for WIAT, a CBS affiliate. He joined WJOX-AM where he provides hourly sports reports from 9:00 AM to 3:00 PM. In the past two years, Bell was the weeknight host of College Sports Central on the now-defunct College Sports Southeast. He has also worked for ESPN and hosts The Tee Time Golf Show on WVUA and WOTM and is a radio broadcaster for XM Sirius Radio. He has called games for the Alabama Crimson Tide, the NFL on Fox, NFL Europe for Fox, golf for SiriusXM PGA Tour Radio, PGA Tour Network, and college football and basketball for Fox Sports Net. He is divorced from his former wife Birmingham Brenda who is a newscaster for ABC 33/40. Doug now works with iTalkSEC as a Host along with Scott Moore on www.italksec.com or 101.1 in Birmingham Alabama

Personal

References

1961 births
People from Birmingham, Alabama
Golf writers and broadcasters
National Football League announcers
NFL Europe broadcasters
College football announcers
College basketball announcers in the United States
Living people
Journalists from Alabama